Ill Repute is an American hardcore punk band from Oxnard, California, United States, formed in 1981. They are noted for popularizing the "Nardcore" sound in the mid-1980s hardcore punk scene, and recorded for Mystic Records.

Their record What Happens Next? (What Happened Then? on CD) holds high status in hardcore circles. It is notable for its cover of the 1970s pop music hit "Indian Reservation (The Lament of the Cherokee Reservation Indian)" (aka "The Pale Faced Indian", aka ""Indian Reservation", aka "Cherokee Nation"). On the Ill Repute record, the cover song version uses the "Cherokee Nation" version of the song title.

The band broke up in July 2004 after a short tour of Hawaii with the Oahu band 8mm Overdose. Ill Repute briefly reformed again (minus founding guitarist Tony Cortez) to tour Hawaii in 2006 again with 8mm Overdose. The lead guitarist, Tony Cortez (original band member) is considered the "Mayor of Nardcore."

Ill Repute has reformed with original members, (except Carl Valdez replaced by Chuck Shultz) they played one show in Ventura, CA on December 16 which they claimed was to be their last show but have since reformed.

Before a standing-room-only crowd in the City Council Chambers of Port Hueneme, Ill Repute was presented a Proclamation from then-Mayor Jonathan Sharkey on April 7, 2014, for "their revolutionary musical talent". Later in 2014, they were inducted into the Ventura County Music Awards Hall of Fame.

The documentary DVD/book, Clean Cut American Kids - the Story of Ill Repute, was also released in 2014 by True Underground Network Publishing in association with Firehook Entertainment and Canadian Bacon Films.

Ill Repute original lineup
John Phaneuf - Vocals
Tony Cortez - Guitar
Jimmy Callahan - Bass
Carl Valdez - Drums

Discography

Oxnard - Land of No Toilets 7-inch, Mystic 1983 M33129
It Came from Slimey Valley, V/A, LP Ghetto Way 1983 GTO33001
Rodney on the Roq: Volume 3, V/A, LP 1983 Posh Boy PBS 140
We Got Power - Party or Go Home, V/A, LP Mystic 1983 MLP33125
What Happens Next 12-inch, Mystic 1984 M124518
Nardcore Compilation LP, Mystic 1984 MLP33135
Halloween Live at Mystic 7-inch, Mystic 1984 M7EP140
Halloween Live at Mystic 2 7” Mystic 1984 M7EP141
Mystic Sampler 1, V/A, LP Mystic 1984 MLP33126
COPulation - The Sound of Hollywood, V/A, Mystic 1984 MLP33128
Covers, V/A, LP Mystic 1985 MLP33132
Let’s Die, V/A LP Mystic 1985 MLP33131
Mystic Sampler 2, V/A LP Mystic 1985 MLP33127
Mystic Super Seven Sampler 1, V/A, 7-inch, Mystic 1985 M7EP139
We Got Power 2 - Party Animal, V/A LP Mystic 1985 MLP33137
Omelette LP, Mystic 1985 MLP33139
Mystic Sampler 3, V/A LP Mystic 1986 MLP33147
Mystic Super Seven Sampler LP 12-inch Mystic 1987 MLP33140
Transition LP, Mystic 1989 MLP33170
Big Rusty Balls CD, Dr. Strange Records 1994 DSR16
"One Big Happy Slam Pit, V/A, LP Spider Club Music 1996 SCM40002-1 
Localism... A Comp of Bands from the Oxnard, California Area, V/A LP It’s Alive Records 1996 IAR-4
It's Only Fun Till Someone Gets Hurt! split 7-inch w/ Good Riddance, It's Alive Records 1997 IAR5
Positive Charged CD, GTA 1997 GTA030
BLEED CD, Edge Records 1997
And Now... CD, Edge Records 1998
As A Matter of Fact split CD w/ Good Riddance, The Almighty Trigger Happy, & Satanic Surfers, Bad Taste Records 1998 BTR22 and Fearless Records FO35
City Rockers: A Tribute to the Clash, V/A CD CHORD Records 1999 CR30
"Absolute Pleasure: A Tribute to Rocky Horror, V/A, Center of the World Records 1999 COTW004
We’ll Get Back at Them Indecision Records 1999 IND18.5,
What Happened Then? Mystic Records CD 2000 MCD182, CD, LP 2008
LIVE CD, Let Them Eat Records 2005 LTER2495-4
Welcome to the Neighborhood Compilation CD, Let Them Eat Records 2005 LTER2495-3
Nardcore - 30 Years Later V/A, LP/CD, Burning Tree Records 2009 BTR13
Best of Ill Repute CD Mystic 2011 MCD169
The 1982 Demos LP Mankind Records 2015 MKD11

References

External links

Official Website
Facebook
 Jones, Casey, "Ill Repute (Interview)" (PDF), Constructive Destruction, no. 1, 1984.

Musical groups from Ventura County, California
Hardcore punk groups from California
Musicians from Oxnard, California